La Hoz de la Vieja is a municipality located in the province of Teruel, Aragon, Spain. According to the 2004 census (INE), the municipality has a population of 108 inhabitants.

It is located at the eastern end of the Sierra de Cucalón area.

See also
Cuencas Mineras

References 

Municipalities in the Province of Teruel